Primer Plano was a Spanish film magazine established on 20 October 1940. The founder was a Falange member Manuel Augusto García Viñolas. It was published on a weekly basis. The Falange-influenced publication struck a balance between its coverage of film stars and film reviews, as well as the role of entertainment and film in society.

Primer Plano ceased publication with the October 1963 issue.

References

External links
 

1940 establishments in Spain
1940 disestablishments in Spain
Defunct magazines published in Spain
Entertainment trade magazines
Film magazines published in Spain
Magazines established in 1940
Magazines disestablished in 1963
Spanish-language magazines
Weekly magazines published in Spain